Shift72 is a New Zealand-based company that facilitates an online video streaming platform. It was founded in 2008.

Shift72 is best known for facilitating online film festivals during the ongoing COVID-19 pandemic which prevented physical screenings. It hosted festivals for TIFF, Sundance Film Festival, Cannes Film Festival, and SXSW. According to Indiewire, the company hosted more than 100 virtual festivals since March 2020.

See also
 Online film festivals

References below

Streaming media systems
New Zealand companies established in 2008